Jorgelina Aranda (19 August 1942 – 10 January 2015) was an Argentine actress, television personality and model.

Life and career
Born in Buenos Aires, Aranda began her career as an advertising spokesmodel. She made her film debut in  1965, with the Dino Risi's commedia all'italiana Il Gaucho, and later appeared in  numerous films, often comedies alongside Alberto Olmedo and Jorge Porcel. She became popular thanks to her participation to the Channel 11 variety show Si lo sabe cante.

Personal life
Aranda was married to television producer Eduardo Consuegra.

Death
Aranda died, aged 72, after a long illness.

Filmography

1964: Il gaucho
1969: El botón (TV Series, 16 episodes)
1972: El pasito (TV Series 3 episodes)
1972: Todos los pecados del mundo
1972: ¿De quiénes son las mujeres?
1973: Este loco, loco, Buenos Aires
1974: Humor a la italiana (TV Series, 1 episode)
1975: The Inquisitor
1977: Basta de mujeres
1977: Hay que parar la delantera
1979: Expertos en Pinchazos
1980: The Beach of Love
1980: Shared Department
1981: Multiple Lovers
1981: Abierto día y noche
1986: Soy paciente

References

External links
 

1942 births
2015 deaths
Actresses from Buenos Aires
Argentine film actresses
20th-century Argentine actresses
Argentine female models
Argentine television personalities
Women television personalities
Deaths from cancer in Argentina
21st-century Argentine women